Sandeep Kulkarni (born 16 November) is an Indian actor and painter. He has worked in Marathi films as well as theatre.

Early life and background
Born in Pune, Sandeep was raised in a Maharashtrian middle-class family by father Shrikant Kulkarni and mother Lata Kulkarni. He is an alumnus of J. J. School of Arts, Mumbai.

During his journey of becoming an artist at Sir J. J. School of Art, he was mentored by Prabhakar Kolte and Atul Dodia. In 1986, Kulkarni participated in a group monsoon show — the first exhibition of his work at the Jehangir Art Gallery. In the same year, he completed his graduation (Bachelor of Fine Arts). While pursuing painting and freelancing for advertising agencies, Sandeep was also exploring acting until he met Pandit Satyadev Dubey and did rigorous theater and workshops with him which includes a big production of a Hindi classical play called "Andha Yug" where he could share stage with amazing actors like Naseeruddin Shah, Amrish Puri, Akaash Khurana and Mohan Bhandari. Heavily influenced as well as inspired by Dubeyji's teachings and simultaneously working with renowned theater directors like Vijaya Mehta, Sunil Shanbhaug and Chetan Datar, Sandeep found himself perfectly fit to be an actor and theater director.

Career
After intense theatre for four years in English, Marathi and Hindi, his career started to take shape in television. He played varied roles such as that of young Muslim lawyer Salim in love with a local Muslim woman on 9 Malabar Hill on Zee TV, a press reporter in Farz on DD Metro, an underworld don who deals with drugs in Swabhiman on DD, a counselor in Nyay on DD Metro. He also played the role of a cop who solves the mystery behind an old couple refusing to accept the dead body of their son in the much-talked-about one-hour suspense thriller First Kill directed by Shriram Raghavan.

Sandeep’s career in films began with his first role in the movie Mammo (1994) directed by the legendary Shyam Benegal, set in the backdrop of India-Pakistan partition (1947). He was seen playing the role of an immigration officer (Apte) who tries to help the immigrant protagonist Mammo.

He played the role of a gangster, Shankar, who chases the hero throughout the plot wearing a new pair of shoes that bite and eventually hurt him in Is Raat Ki Subaah Nahin (1996) directed by Sudhir Mishra. His role added to the black humor of the film.

He played a Naxalite who later becomes an activist, in spite of his colleagues being caught and killed in Hazar Chaurasi Ki Maa (1998), directed by Govind Nihalani.

Shwaas (2004), directed by Sandip Sawant, put Sandeep’s performance in the spotlight. He played the role of an oncologist who attempts to convince the grandfather of a child suffering from eye cancer to agree to a life-saving surgery although he is faced with the reality of child becoming permanently blind. Sandeep's biggest compliment of his career was earned when, after watching the film, the legendary actor Shabana Azmi asked him if he had studied medicine. Shwass won Sandeep numerous awards: the State Award being one of them. The film won the National Award as well and was India's official entry to the Oscars.

In a 2005 film, Hazaaron Khwaishein Aisi, directed by Sudhir Mishra, Sandeep played a Naxal leader, Probir, involved in spreading the Naxalite movement from Bengal to India.

2005 saw another success in Sandeep's career when he played a common man from downtown (Dombivali), on the edge of busy, frustrating, unimproved and deteriorating daily lifestyle who eventually starts straightening things around him in the critically acclaimed Dombivali Fast, directed by Nishikant Kamath. This film got the National Award and Sandeep won the best Acotr Award from the State and other award functions too.

In 2005 Sandeep also played the role of Sane Guruji, a biopic teacher, poet, freedom fighter, also known as Gandhiji of Maharashtra in Sane Guruji. Sandeep’s career includes other series of films such as Adhantari (2005), Maay Baap (2006), Rajkaran (2007).

Traffic Signal (2006) is a national award-winning film, directed by Madhur Bhandarkar, where Sandeep played an NGO volunteer who is seen helping street children.

In the Marathi film Made in China (2009), he took the role of a young farmer who is literate and updated on technology and who challenges his uncle, a politician who intends to bring in a special economic zone (SEZ). 2009 also saw him perform the double role of a young businessman creating identity crisis for his wife, family and friends. In 2009 Sandeep won the best actor award in the International Nigerian Film Festival for Ek Daav Sansaracha where he plays the role of a husband with a complex due to a failed marriage, blamed impotency and his struggle to make a second marriage work.

In 2010 other Marathi films that Sandeep acted in include Khel Saat Baaracha and Pratisaad - The Response. Other films in the pipeline scheduled for release in 2011 included Nirvana 13 and Paranoia (under production). Sandeep Kulkarni also influenced people by showing his tremendous work in the Marathi movie Duniyadari.

From 2012 he started his production house which executed films like "Premsutra" in Marathi and "Dombivli Return" in Hindi and Marathi (bilingual) which was a part of a few national and international festivals and he won the best actor from the Indian Critics Choice Awards in 2020. His webseries "City Of Dreams" directed by Nagesh Kukunoor on Hotstar has engaged a huge global audience and the 2nd season will be soon on air.

Filmography
{| class=wikitable
|-
!Year !! Film !! Role !! Language !! Notes !!References
|-
|1994 ||Mammo || Inspector Apte || Hindi || ||
|-
|1996 ||Is Raat ki Subah Nahin || Shankar || Hindi || ||
|-
|1998 || Hazaar Chowrasi ki Maa || Ritu || Hindi || ||
|-
|1999 || Shool || Gopalji || Hindi || ||
|-
|2002|| Aadharstambh || Iqbal || Marathi || ||
|-
|2004 || Shwaas || Dr. Sane || Marathi || ||
|-
|rowspan="3" |2005 ||Dombivali Fast || Madhav Apte || Marathi || ||
|-
|Hazaaron Khwaishein Aisi|| Probir (Naxalite) || Hindi || ||
|-
|Adhantari || || Marathi || ||
|-
|2006
|Sane Guruji || Sane Guruji || Marathi || ||
|-
|rowspan="2" | 2007 ||Traffic Signal || Khadi (social worker) || Hindi || ||
|-
| Rajkaran || || Marathi || ||
|-
|rowspan="3" | 2008 || Maay Baap || Vishvanath || Marathi || ||
|-
| Bedhund || Army Major || Marathi || ||
|-
|Ek Daav Sansaracha || Ajit Sawant || Marathi || ||
|-
|rowspan="4" | 2009 ||Ladies Special || Shivam Shinde || Marathi ||TV Show on "SONY TV"||
|-
|Made in China (2009 film) || Mohit Jagdale || Marathi || ||
|-
|Gaiir || Sameer Shroff || Marathi || ||
|-
|Waiting Room || Ghanshyam || Hindi || ||
|-
|rowspan="3"|2010 || Pratisaad - The Response || Dr. Aditya Deshmukh || Marathi ||  ||
|-
|Ankganit Anandache || Anand || Marathi || ||
|-
| Khel Saat-Baaracha || Khobragade ||Marathi || ||
|-
|rowspan="3"|2011 || Nirvana 13 || Naseer || Hindi || Filming ||
|-
|Fakira|| ||Hindi ||  ||
|-
|Paranoia|| || || || 
|-
|rowspan="4"|2013 ||D-Day || Atul Mishra || Hindi || ||
|-
|Duniyadari || M.K.(Shreyas) || Marathi || ||
|-
|Ajinkya || Anant Dharmadhikari || Marathi || ||
|-
|Premsutra || Anand Joshi || Marathi || ||
|-
|2018 ||Dhaad || Pranjivan || Gujarati || Released 17 years after being shot ||
|-
|2019 ||Krutant || || Marathi || || 
|}

TelevisionMayanagari-City of Dreams(Hotstar)AvantikaGuntata Hriday HeCID (1999)9 Malabar Hill (1997)Swabhimaan (Doordarshan)Farz (DD Metro)Nyaay (DD Metro)

Awards and honors

International awards

2004 - Official entry for the Oscars: Shwaas2008 - Nigerian International Film Festival Award - Best Actor, Ek Daav SansarachaNational awards
2004 - Shwaas2005 - Dombivali Fast2007 - Traffic Signal (film)State awards
2004 - Best Actor, Shwaas2005 - Best Actor, Dombivali Fast2005 - Best Actor, AdhantariOther awards
2004 - Zee Award – Best Actor, Shwaas2005 - Zee Award – Best Actor, Maharashtra Times Awards – Best Actor, Dombivali Fast''

References

External links
 

20th-century births
Living people
People from Pune
Marathi actors
Indian male film actors
21st-century Indian male actors
Year of birth missing (living people)
Male actors in Marathi television